Carabonematidae is a family of nematodes belonging to the order Rhabditida.

Genera:
 Carabonema Stammer & Wachek, 1952

References

Nematodes